Shilpa Shukla (born 22 February 1982) is an Indian film and theatre actress.  She is known for her roles in the 2007 sports drama Chak De! India and the 2013 neo-noir film B.A. Pass, for which she was awarded the Filmfare Critics Award for Best Actress.

Biography
Shukla was born in the Vaishali district of Bihar. She comes from a family of bureaucrats, political leaders, and scholars. Her brother, Tenzin Priyadarshi, is a Buddhist monk, and her sister is an attorney.

Filmography

Feature films

Short films 
 Bullet (short film)

Television 
 Savdhaan India (Mini Series) - Host
 Rajuben (Mini Series)

Web series

Accolades
 Won
2008 Screen Awards: Best Supporting Actress for Chak De India
2014 Screen Awards: Best Actor in a Negative Role (Female) for B.A. Pass
2014 Filmfare Awards: Best Actress (Critics) for B.A. Pass
 Nominations
 2008: Filmfare Awards: Best Supporting Actress for Chak De India 
 2008: International Indian Film Academy Awards: Best Performance in a Negative Role for Chak De India
 2008: Zee Cine Awards: Best Actor in a Negative Role for Chak De India
 2008: Producer Guild Awards: Best actor in a Negative Role for Chak De India
 2013: Big Fan Awards: Best fan Award from Miss world Tamanna Rana

References

External links

 
 

Living people
Actresses in Hindi cinema
Indian film actresses
Indian stage actresses
Actresses from Bihar
1982 births
Filmfare Awards winners
Screen Awards winners